Clay Township is one of 17 townships in Kosciusko County, Indiana. As of the 2010 census, its population was 1,712 and it contained 738 housing units.

Geography

Cities and towns
 Claypool

Unincorporated towns
 Packerton at 
(This list is based on USGS data and may include former settlements.)

References

External links
 Indiana Township Association
 United Township Association of Indiana

Townships in Kosciusko County, Indiana
Townships in Indiana